Rossana Ghessa (born 24 January 1943) is an Italian actress, from Sardinia, and a naturalized Brazilian. She appeared in 43 films between 1966 and 1996.

Selected filmography
 OSS 117 Takes a Vacation (1970)
 The Palace of Angels (1970)
 Ana Terra (1971)

References

External links

1943 births
Living people
Brazilian film actresses
Naturalized citizens of Brazil
Italian film actresses
20th-century Italian actresses